Liang Wenhao (born July 6, 1992) is a Chinese male short track speed skater. He represented China at the 2010 Winter Olympics in Vancouver and the 2014 Winter Olympics in Sochi.

References

1992 births
Living people
Chinese male speed skaters
Chinese male short track speed skaters
Olympic short track speed skaters of China
Short track speed skaters at the 2010 Winter Olympics
Short track speed skaters at the 2014 Winter Olympics
Asian Games medalists in short track speed skating
Asian Games gold medalists for China
Short track speed skaters at the 2011 Asian Winter Games
Medalists at the 2011 Asian Winter Games
21st-century Chinese people